Allyn is a census-designated place (CDP) in Mason County, Washington, United States. The population was 1,963 at the 2010 census. It was part of the former Allyn-Grapeview CDP that was broken up into Allyn and Grapeview in 2010.  Allyn is located on the western shore of North Bay region of the Case Inlet of the Puget Sound. The area's main road and thoroughfare is State Route 3.

History
The community was first settled in 1853. The town was platted and papers to form the town were filed on September 6, 1889, naming the town after Judge Frank Allyn of Tacoma who was influential in the early development of Allyn.  By 1890 Allyn had a post office, school, newspaper, sawmill, two saloons, a hotel and wharf.

Lakeland Village

The Lakeland Village development, a residential and recreational corporation begun in the late 1960s, includes over 800 homes. A 27-hole golf course and Lake Anderson, a 50 acre private lake, provides recreational activities for residents.

Transportation
From the 1870s to the 1920s, transportation needs for Allyn and other communities along Case Inlet were once served by a small flotilla of steamboats.  The last steamboat run from Tacoma to Allyn occurred in 1924, but local service may have lasted longer.

Newspaper
The local community based monthly newspaper called the North Bay Review, services Allyn.

References

External links 

 Allyn page at Official Mason County Tourism website
 LakeLand Village Community Club official website
 Lake Anderson in LakeLand Village official website

Census-designated places in Mason County, Washington
Census-designated places in Washington (state)